Richard Joseph Hopkins (April 4, 1873 – August 28, 1943) was a justice of the Kansas Supreme Court and a United States district judge of the United States District Court for the District of Kansas.

Education and career

Born in Jefferson City, Missouri, Hopkins received a Bachelor of Laws from Northwestern University Pritzker School of Law in 1901. He was in private practice in Chicago, Illinois from 1901 to 1906, and in Garden City, Kansas from 1906 to 1913. He was a member of the Kansas House of Representatives in 1909, and was thereafter the 19th Lieutenant Governor of Kansas, from 1911 to 1912 serving under Governor Walter R. Stubbs. Hopkins was a city attorney of Garden City from 1913 to 1918. He was the Kansas Attorney General from 1919 to 1923. He was an associate justice of the Kansas Supreme Court from 1923 to 1929.

Federal judicial service

On October 17, 1929, Hopkins was nominated by President Herbert Hoover to a seat on the United States District Court for the District of Kansas vacated by Judge George Thomas McDermott. Hopkins was confirmed by the United States Senate on December 19, 1929, and received his commission the same day. Hopkins served in that capacity until his death on August 28, 1943 in Kansas City, Kansas. He was interred in Highland Park Cemetery in Kansas City, Kansas.

References

Sources
 
 

 

1873 births
1943 deaths
Judges of the United States District Court for the District of Kansas
United States district court judges appointed by Herbert Hoover
20th-century American judges
Lieutenant Governors of Kansas
Kansas Attorneys General
Justices of the Kansas Supreme Court
Members of the Kansas House of Representatives
Northwestern University Pritzker School of Law alumni
People from Garden City, Kansas